Dina Ilyinichna Rubina (born 19 September 1953 in Tashkent) is a Russian-Israeli prose writer. She is one of the most prominent Russian-language Israeli writers.

Biography
Dina Rubina was born in Tashkent, Uzbekistan. She studied music at the Tashkent Conservatory.  She published her first story at the age of sixteen in "Yunost."  In the mid-1980s, after writing for the stage and screen for several years, she  moved to Moscow. In 1990, she immigrated to Israel.

Literary career
Dina Rubina is one of the most prominent Russian-language Israeli writers. Her books have been translated into thirty languages.

Her major themes are Jewish and Israeli history, migration, nomadism and neo-indigeneity, messianism and metaphysics, theatre, autobiography, and the interplay between the Israeli and Russian Jewish cultures and between Hebrew and Russian.

Dual Surname (Двойная фамилия) was turned into a film screened on Russia's Channel One.

In 2007, Rubina won the Russian Big Book literary award.

Published works

Novels
1996 — Messiah comes! («Вот идёт Мессия!»)
1998 — Last wild pig from Pontevedra («Последний кабан из лесов Понтеведра»)
2004 — The Syndicate («Синдикат»)
2006 — Sunny side of the Street(«На солнечной стороне улицы»)
2008 — Style of Leonardo («Почерк Леонардо»)  , 978-5-699-27369-0
3 more editions
2009 — White dove of Cordova («Белая голубка Кордовы»),  
2 more editions
2010 — Petrushka's Syndrome («Синдром Петрушки»).

Short stories
1980 — «Когда же пойдёт снег…?»
1982 — «Дом за зелёной калиткой»
1987 — «Отворите окно!»
1990 — «Двойная фамилия»
1994 — «Один интеллигент уселся на дороге»
1996 — «Уроки музыки»
1997 — «Ангел конвойный»
1999 — «Высокая вода венецианцев»
1999 — «Астральный полёт души на уроке физики»
2002 — «Глаза героя крупным планом»
2002 — «Воскресная месса в Толедо»
2002 — «Во вратах твоих»
2003 — «Несколько торопливых слов любви»
2004 — «Наш китайский бизнес»
2008 — «Астральный полёт души на уроке физики»
2008 — «Итак, продолжаем!..»
2008 — «Мастер-тарабука»
2008 — «Чужие подъезды»
2008 — «Холодная весна в Провансе»
2008 — «Камера наезжает!..» повесть
2009 — «Любка»
2010 — «Миф сокровенный…». Издательство: Эксмо, твёрдый переплёт, 432 с., тираж 4000 экз., 
2010 — «Больно только когда смеюсь». Издательство: Эксмо, ; 2010 г.
2010 — «Адам и Мирьям». Авторский сборник. Издательство: Эксмо, твёрдый переплёт, 416 с., тираж: 4000 экз., 
2010 — «Фарфоровые затеи»
2011 — «Душегубица»
2012 — «Окна»

Essays
1999 — «Под знаком карнавала»
«Я — офеня»
«Я не любовник макарон, или кое-что из иврита»
Call me! («Позвони мне, позвони!»)
«Дети» (Children)
«А не здесь вы не можете не ходить?!»
2001 - What to do? («Чем бы заняться?»)
Mein pijak in weisse kletka («Майн пиджак ин вайсе клетка…»)
Jerusalem bus («Иерусалимский автобус»)
Afterwords («Послесловие к сюжету»)

English translations
The Blackthorn, a story from Lives in Transit, Ardis Publishers, 1995.

See also
 Russian Jews in Israel

References

Bibliography 
 Katsman, Roman. Nostalgia for a Foreign Land: Studies in Russian-Language Literature in Israel. Series: Jews of Russia and Eastern Europe and Their Legacy. Brighton MA: Academic Studies Press, 2016.
 Kuznetsova, Natalia. “Simvolika ognia v romane-komikse Diny Rubinoi ‘Sindikat,’ ili Ob ‘ognennom angele nashego podiezda’” [Symbolism of fire in the novel-comics by Dina Rubina “Sindicate”]. Booknik, March 20, 2008. Accessed June 20, 2014. booknik.ru/library/all/simvolika-ognya-v-romane-komikse-diny-rubinoyi-sindikat-ili-ob-ognennom-angele-nashego-podezda.
 Mondry, Henrietta. Exemplary Bodies: Constructing the Jew in Russian Culture, 1880s to 2008. Boston: Academic Studies Press, 2009.
 Ronell, Anna P. “Some Thoughts on Russian-Language Israeli Fiction: Introducing Dina Rubina.” Prooftexts 28, no. 2 (2008): 197–231.
 Sergo, Iulia. “Postmodernistski dialog kultur: obraz Ispanii v romane D. Rubinoi ‘Poslednyi kaban iz lesov Pontevedra’” [Postmodern dialogue of cultures: The image of Spain in Dina Rubina’s novel The last wild boar from the forests of Pontevedra]. Filologicheski klass 17 (2007): 49–53.
 Shafranskaya, Eleonora. Sindrom golubki [Dove syndrome]. St. Petersburg: Svoio izdatelstvo, 2012.
 Shkarpetkina, Olga. “‘Poslednyi kaban iz lesov Pontevedra’ Diny Rubinoi" [The last wild boar from the forests of Pontevedra by Dina Rubina]. Kultura i iskusstvo, July 20, 2013. Accessed June 15, 2014. www.cultandart.ru/prose/48269-poslednij_kaban_iz_lesov_pontevedra.

External links
Rubina's site

Living people
1953 births
Russian women novelists
Israeli novelists
Writers from Tashkent
Uzbekistani Jews
Soviet Jews
Soviet women writers
Soviet short story writers
20th-century short story writers
Israeli women short story writers
Israeli short story writers
Israeli women novelists
20th-century Israeli women writers
20th-century Israeli writers
21st-century Israeli women writers
21st-century Israeli writers
Soviet emigrants to Israel
Israeli people of Uzbekistani-Jewish descent